Lena Müller (born 16 June 1987 in Duisburg) is a German rower.  At the 2012 Summer Olympics, she competed in the women's lightweight double sculls with Anja Noske.

References

 

1987 births
Living people
German female rowers
Sportspeople from Duisburg
Rowers at the 2012 Summer Olympics
Olympic rowers of Germany
World Rowing Championships medalists for Germany
European Rowing Championships medalists
20th-century German women
21st-century German women